The Queen's Arms (sometimes styled "The Queens Arms") is a Grade II listed public house in Birmingham, England, built . It is noted for the tiled art nouveau signage on its exterior, which was remodelled in 1901 to the designs of the architect, Joseph D. Ward for its then owners, Mitchells & Butlers.

The red brick building sits on the corner of Charlotte Street and Newhall Street, on the edge of the city's Jewellery Quarter. It was given Grade II listed status in April 2004.

Scenes for the BBC serial television drama Line of Duty were filmed in the pub.

History 

The public house was managed by the following tenants:

 1911–1913 William Francis Robbins

References

External links 
 

Pubs in Birmingham, West Midlands
Commercial buildings completed in 1870
Commercial buildings completed in 1901
Art Nouveau architecture in England
Mitchells & Butlers
Grade II listed buildings in Birmingham